Willard Katsande (born 15 January 1986 in Mutoko, Mashonaland East Province) is a retired Zimbabwean professional footballer, a former player of Premier Soccer League club Kaizer Chiefs and the Zimbabwe national team. He also played with DStv Premiership side Sekhukhune United F.C.

Club career

Early career
Known as a midfield work-horse, Willard Katsande began his career playing for local lower division clubs in Zimbabwe such as Frontier Steel (2002–2005), Feruka (2006–2007) and a popular giant killing club from Mutare, called Highway (2007–2009) from where he was recruited to play for Gunners F.C. in Harare for the 2009–10 season.

Gunners F.C.
At Gunners, Katsande made a huge contribution to the club's campaign in the CAF Champions League qualifiers. He was in irresistible form as the Gunners shocked African giants Al-Ahly 1–0 at Rufaro Stadium in the Champions League second round match before eventually bowing out on 2–1 aggregate, after losing the reverse encounter 2–0 in Cairo. The Gunners would however finish 1st in their league, clinching the title as Zimbabwean Premier League Champions for the 2009–10 season.

Ajax Cape Town
Willard Katsande made his professional debut for Ajax Cape Town on 12 December 2010 in a 2–0 win against Mpumalanga Black Aces at Atlantic Stadium in Witbank. He was acquired by Ajax Cape Town in the summer of 2010 as a transfer from Zimbabwean club Gunners F.C., having left a lasting impression on the club by his earlier performance with the Gunners in the CAF Champions League qualifiers.

Kaizer Chiefs
On 15 August 2011 it was announced that Willard Katsande had joined the Kaizer Chiefs, after Chiefs manager Bobby Motaung saw his performance, while attending an international friendly match between Zimbabwe and Zambia. Katsande made his debut on 10 September 2011 in the MTN 8 final against Orlando Pirates coming in for Tshabalala in the 81st minute. In his first 12 league matches for Chiefs, Katsande got 5 yellow cards. Katsande won the Premier Soccer League and the Nedbank Cup in 2013 where he was the most booked player with 10 yellow cards including one red card. Katsande scored a long range scorcher after taking a few steps off the centre line in a 4–1 win over Bloemfontein Celtic on 21 July 2013 with his fellow countryman Knowledge Musona scoring on debut.

Katsande scored his first official goal on 15 March 2014 in the Soweto derby against Orlando Pirates, the same team he made his debut against, being a header in the 61st minute in a 1–0 win. He scored almost on the goal line and headed past Senzo Meyiwa. Katsande was the biggest winner at the Kaizer Chiefs Awards on 21 May 2014. He won Players' Player of the Season, May Player of the Month, Fan Player of the Season and Online Player of the Season and Player of the Season awards. He pocketed R230 000 in total prize-money after taking home most of the Awards. He scored his second official goal for Chiefs in a 2–1 win loss to Black Leopards in the Nedbank Cup on 21 March 2015, exactly 371 days after scoring his first. He won the MTN8 and his second league title in 2014–15.

International career 
Katsande was called up for national duty to represent Zimbabwe as of 2010, after his successful run with the Gunners, playing for the country's 2012 Africa Cup of Nations qualifying campaign.

Career statistics

Club
.

International
.

International goals
. Scores and results list Zimbabwe's goal tally first.

Honours

Club
Gunners
Zimbabwe Premier Soccer League (1): 2009–10

Ajax Cape Town
2010 Telkom Knockout: Finalist

Kaizer Chiefs
Premier Soccer League (2): 2012–13, 2014–15
Nedbank Cup (1): 2012–13
MTN 8 (1): 2014

References

1986 births
Living people
People from Mutoko
Zimbabwean footballers
Zimbabwe international footballers
Zimbabwean expatriates in South Africa
Expatriate soccer players in South Africa
Cape Town Spurs F.C. players
Association football midfielders
Kaizer Chiefs F.C. players
Sportspeople from Mashonaland East Province
2017 Africa Cup of Nations players